Christmas is the sixth EP release by the post-metal band Jesu. It was released digitally on 9 December 2010, via Avalanche Recordings. The EP contains the track "Christmas", along with two remixes of the song, mixed by Justin Broadrick's side projects Pale Sketcher and Final.

A limited CD and vinyl edition with 500 copies was released by Robotic Empire on 27 November 2012.

According to Broadrick, the EP was inspired by "the onset of the Christmas period and the onset of emotions and feelings of nostalgia, joy and sadness that the period often evokes". The title song, "Christmas", was described as "a frosty, sun-glinted, dreamy, nine-minute snowglobe dirge" by Spin.

Track listing

References

External links
 Official website for the Jesu EP, "Christmas"

2010 EPs
Jesu (band) albums
Christmas albums by British artists
2010 Christmas albums
Christmas EPs